Ravagh Persian Grill is a chain of restaurants serving Iranian cuisine in the New York metropolitan area. The name of the restaurant means "portico" in Farsi.

Locations
There were five locations, including two in Manhattan, two on Long Island, and one in Edgewater, New Jersey, as of 2017. The East Village restaurant closed in 2020, during the COVID-19 pandemic. The first location opened in 1998 in Midtown Manhattan.

Reception
Emma Diab of Thrillist included Ravagh in her list of the city's best Middle Eastern restaurants in 2017. Eater New York Alexandra Ilyashov recommended Ravagh in her 2018 list of the city's Middle Eastern restaurants. She, Ilana Dadras, and Urvija Banerji also included Ravagh in a 2020 list of Upper East Side restaurants. Zagat rated the East Village restaurant 4.3 for food, 3.4 for decor, and 3.9 for service, each on a scale of 5, and said, "Among NYC's few options for classic Persian cooking, these Eastsiders dish up flavorful, stick-to-your-ribs fare including succulent kebabs and delicious rice dishes; generous portions and value prices offset the lacking decor.

See also

 List of Middle Eastern restaurants
 List of restaurants in New York City

References

External links
 

1998 establishments in New York City
Iranian-American culture in New York (state)
Middle Eastern restaurants in the United States
Restaurants established in 1998
Restaurants in New Jersey
Restaurants in New York City